Love Thy Woman is a 2020 Philippine drama television series broadcast by Kapamilya Channel. Directed by Jeffrey Jeturian and Jerry Lopez Sineneng, it stars Kim Chiu, Yam Concepcion and Xian Lim. The series aired on ABS-CBN's Kapamilya Gold afternoon block and worldwide via The Filipino Channel from February 10 to September 11, 2020, replacing Kadenang Ginto and it was replaced by Bagong Umaga.

Plot
Jia Wong and Dana Wong are half-sisters and daughters of Chinese Filipino self-made billionaire Adam Wong with two different women. Jia's mother is Kai Estrella, Adam's mistress, and Dana's mother is Lucy Gongsu-Wong, Adam's legal wife. The Wong daughters are beautiful, charming and intelligent, groomed to lead and head Dragon Empire Builders, a multi-million peso real estate business established by Adam.

Adam acknowledges his relationship with Kai and his daughter Jia, who form part of the Wong immediate family, attending all family and social events. Adam's wife, Lucy, is not happy about this but swallows her resentment and accepts their constant presence in their lives.

Lucy comes from a wealthy Singaporean family, her Filipino mother was one of her father's wives. Her mother leaves and Lucy is raised by her Chinese Singaporean father who hates and mistrusts those of Filipino descent. So when Lucy falls in love with Adam, her father disowns and curses her. Lucy never sees her family again. After Adam's indiscretion with Kai, Lucy sees it as the unravelling of her father's curse. Forced to accept her husband's mistress, the two families coexist under Adam's care. Because Adam is a prominent businessman, society accepts Kai as Adam's consort with a place in the social structure.

Jia is an interior designer who remained in Manila for her studies, working at her father’s company. Dana finished her degree in architecture in Singapore where she meets and falls in love with David Chao.

Dana becomes pregnant with David and the couple plans to marry. As part of a pre-wedding ritual, the families have the couple's fortune read. The seer warns them of the curse and urges them to stop the wedding.  Despite Lucy's apprehensions, Adam does not believe in the curse and the wedding follows. The "Wedding of the Year" that begins like a fairy tale, ends in a tragic car accident, leaving Dana in a deep coma. Medical experts from different countries step in with modern treatments but nobody can induce Dana out of her comatose state. The Wongs and the Chaos watch over Dana for over a year. Lucy believes that the curse is at work.

It was during this emotional time that Jia and David's shared grief of possibly losing Dana, blossoms into an illicit affair which results in chaos within the family.  Harsh condemnation by Adam and Lucy and Jia's regret over betraying her older sister, drive Kai and Jia to leave the Wong family to start a new life on their own in Singapore. Jia discovers she is pregnant with David's son and finds success as a furniture designer, opening a furniture store with her boss, Richie Tan. But despite her success, the curse follows her as she suffers from breast cancer and loses her son.

Meanwhile in Manila, Dana comes out of her coma. As she recovers, she is curious about what happened during the 18 months she was asleep. No one can give her a straight answer on why Jia and Kai left. Not believing that her father banished Jia for venturing out on her own, Dana becomes suspicious of David having an affair and that Jia's disappearance is related to David's emotional distance.

While David tries to make up for his indiscretion by sticking to their marriage, Dana's obsession to get the truth drives her to maltreat David. He considers filing for an annulment. Adam and Lucy are happy about this because they have not forgiven David for his betrayal of Dana.

Amidst the turmoil in their marriage, it is revealed that Jia's son did not die. Kai's brother Harry kidnapped the baby and was given to Lucy in exchange for money for Jia's cancer treatment. Unbeknownst to everyone except Lucy, the infant is left at the gate of the Wong residence and adopted by David and Dana.

In Singapore, Jia recovers from her illness and together with Richie, opens RJ&E Design, a furniture design and manufacturing company that becomes the most sought out furniture maker in Asia.

In Manila, Dana is in line to become the next CEO of Dragon Empire Builders once Adam announces his retirement. Motivated to expand and increase their sales as VP of Operations, Dana is set on a brand alliance with RJ&E Design. After several attempts for a meeting to submit a proposal, Lucy and Dana fly to Singapore and discover that Jia is the owner. Jia turns down their proposal.  After advising Adam of their unsuccessful proposal, Adam makes some inquiries of his own and discovers Jia is the owner. He flies to Singapore and they have a happy reunion. Flushed with emotions after being separated for a decade, he convinces Jia to return to Manila with the promise to protect her from Lucy and Dana. Jia admits her indiscretion to Dana, hoping to be free of the curse.

From keeping Chinese traditions and Filipino values alive to adapt with the changing times, Love Thy Woman, a family saga spanning two generations, explores love's dark side and the duplicitous polarity of betrayal. A family's journey to heal the mistakes and wounds of the past.

Cast and characters

Main cast
 Kim Chiu as Jia E. Wong  
 Yam Concepcion as Dana G. Wong-Chao 
 Xian Lim as David Chao 

Supporting cast
 Eula Valdez as Lucy Gongsu-Wong  
 Sunshine Cruz as Rebecca "Kai" Estrella 
 Zsa Zsa Padilla as Helen Chao 
 Ruffa Gutierrez as Amanda del Mundo 
 Christopher de Leon as Adam Wong

Recurring cast
 David Chua as Harold "Harry" Estrella 
 Jennifer Sevilla as Carol Teng 
 Mari Kaimo as Manny Tanchangco
 Janna Victoria as Donna Lee
 Tim Yap as Timothy "Tim" Go
 Tart Carlos as Cindy Ong
 Karl Gabriel as Gabriel "Gab" del Mundo  
 Turs Daza as Patrick Matienzo 
 Aurora Yumul as Kong Lin 
 Olive Isidro as Shelia "Shelly" Ramos 
 Shido Roxas as Jacob "Jimmy" Tanchangco
 Chienna Filomeno as Tiffany Go 
 Marina Benipayo as Alicia Chua
 Lloyd Samartino as Eric Chua
 Bryan Santos as Jefferson Chua
 Richard Juan as Richard "Richie" Tan
 MJ Cayabyab as Summer Dy 
 Tori Garcia as Abigail Tanchangco 
 Mikee Agustin as Rosslyn "Ross" Flores
 JC Gamez as Eddie Reyes
 China Yoo as Everly Soo 
 Kimberly Tan as Ellie Reyes
 Abi Kassem as Olive Chan
 JJ Quilantang as Michael W. Chao / Jianyu E. Wong 
 Dominic Ochoa as Simon Cruz 
 Diana Mackey as Sophie Matienzo 
 Ding Dimaunahan as Macario Yalung

Guest cast
 Joonee Gamboa as Zheng Gongsu

Production

Casting
Erich Gonzales was originally cast to play the role of Dana Wong, but she backed out because of creative differences. Yam Concepcion took over the role.

Broadcast

Scheduling
The series airs on ABS-CBN's Kapamilya Gold afternoon block and worldwide on The Filipino Channel.

Despite the community quarantines already lingering, Love Thy Woman continued airing 5 of its fresh, new episodes from March 16–20, 2020.

However, in response to the community quarantine caused by the COVID-19 pandemic in the Philippines, the show temporarily stopped filming new episodes and its timeslot was temporarily taken over by reruns of Walang Hanggan, The Legal Wife, and Got to Believe beginning March 23, 2020.

Prior to the show being put on hiatus, series star Christopher de Leon tested positive for COVID-19. This caused select members of the cast to place themselves in self-quarantine.

Thereafter, the show's future would be placed in doubt after the temporary closure of ABS-CBN following the cease and desist order issued by the National Telecommunications Commission on account of its franchise expiration. However, on June 4, 2020, it was announced that the show would make its return on June 15, 2020 on cable-and-satellite channel Kapamilya Channel.

Rerun
Love Thy Woman re-aired on Kapamilya Channel and A2Z under Kapamilya Gold afternoon lineup block from November 15, 2021 to March 25, 2022. replacing the reruns of Dolce Amore and was replaced by the reruns of Init sa Magdamag.

Ratings

International Broadcast
 Cambodia - CTN

Adaptation
An Indonesian adaptation titled Belenggu Dua Hati (transl. Shackles of Two Hearts) was produced by Tripar Multi Vision Plus and was aired on ANTV for 59 episodes from August 6, 2020 to October 4, 2020.

See also
 List of programs broadcast by ABS-CBN
 List of programs broadcast by Kapamilya Channel
 List of programs broadcast by Kapamilya Online Live
 List of ABS-CBN drama series

References

External links
 
 

ABS-CBN drama series
Philippine romance television series
Philippine crime television series
Philippine melodrama television series
Philippine mystery television series
Television series by Dreamscape Entertainment Television
2020 Philippine television series debuts
2020 Philippine television series endings
Television shows set in the Philippines
Filipino-language television shows
Murder in television
Television productions suspended due to the COVID-19 pandemic